Lillian Lee is a computer scientist whose research involves natural language processing, sentiment analysis, and computational social science. She is a professor of computer science and information science at Cornell University, and co-editor-in-chief of the journal Transactions of the Association for Computational Linguistics.

Education 
Lee graduated from Cornell University in 1993 with an undergraduate degree in math and science. She completed her Ph.D. at Harvard University in 1997. Her dissertation,  Similarity-Based Approaches to Natural Language Processing, was supervised by Stuart M. Shieber.

Career 
Lee has been a member of the Cornell faculty since 1997.

Recognition
Lee has been a fellow of the Association for the Advancement of Artificial Intelligence since 2013, and of the Association for Computational Linguistics since 2017.
Lee was elected as an ACM Fellow in 2018 for "contributions to natural language processing, sentiment analysis, and computational social science".

References

External links
Home page

Year of birth missing (living people)
Living people
American computer scientists
American women computer scientists
Cornell University alumni
Harvard University alumni
Cornell University faculty
Fellows of the Association for the Advancement of Artificial Intelligence
Fellows of the Association for Computing Machinery
Computer scientists
Women computer scientists
Natural language processing researchers
American women academics
21st-century American women